Nuria Llagostera Vives (born 16 May 1980) is a retired Spanish tennis player. In June 2005, Llagostera Vives reached her best singles ranking of world No. 35. In November 2009, she peaked at No. 5 in the WTA doubles rankings.

Professional career
Vives was born in Palma, Majorca, Balearic Islands. In her career, she won two singles and 16 doubles titles on the WTA Tour. She also won the silver medal at the 2005 Mediterranean Games, losing the final to compatriot Laura Pous Tió.

She was the doubles champion at the 2009 WTA Tour Championships, playing with María José Martínez Sánchez. They defeated Serena and Venus Williams en route to a three-set victory over top seeds Cara Black and Liezel Huber.

On 11 November 2013, it was announced that she would be suspended until 7 September 2015 after testing positive for Dextroamphetamine at the Bank of the West Classic in Stanford. She subsequently announced her retirement from professional tennis on 20 November, as a result of the ban ending her hopes to play at the 2016 Summer Olympics.

WTA career finals

Singles: 3 (2 titles, 1 runner-up)

Doubles: 27 (16 titles, 11 runner-ups)

ITF Circuit finals

Singles: 13 (11–2)

Doubles: 10 (5–5)

Performance timelines

Singles

Doubles

ITF Levels

Notes

References

External links
 
 
 
 

1980 births
Living people
Sportspeople from Palma de Mallorca
Spanish female tennis players
Tennis players from the Balearic Islands
Doping cases in tennis
Spanish sportspeople in doping cases
Tennis players at the 2008 Summer Olympics
Tennis players at the 2012 Summer Olympics
Olympic tennis players of Spain
Mediterranean Games gold medalists for Spain
Mediterranean Games silver medalists for Spain
Mediterranean Games medalists in tennis
Competitors at the 2005 Mediterranean Games